"American Psycho" is a song by Canadian band Treble Charger. It was released in July 2000 as the lead single from their fourth album, Wide Awake Bored. The song was a hit in Canada, peaking at number 4 on Canada's Rock chart. The song was nominated for "Best Single" at the 2001 Juno Awards. It is arguably considered to be the band's signature song. On August 6th, 2022, the song reached 5 million streams on the streaming service Spotify.

Charts

In popular culture
 
The song is featured on the MuchMusic compilation album, Big Shiny Tunes 5.
The song is featured in the films, Dude, Where's My Car?, and She Gets What She Wants. 
The song was featured on the soundtrack to the EA Sports Hockey game NHL 2002, along with another Treble Charger song, "Brand New Low".
The song was used in promotional advertisements for the direct-to-video movie American Pie: Band Camp.
The song was used as a plot point in the "Treble Charger" episode of Kevin Spencer.
The song was used in the fifth episode of Tony Hawk's Gigantic Skatepark Tour 2002.

References

External links

2000 singles
Treble Charger songs
2000 songs
Songs written by Greig Nori
Nettwerk Records singles